William May may refer to:

Politicians
 William L. May (1793–1849), U.S. Representative from Illinois
 William May (Northern Ireland politician) (1909–1962), unionist politician in Northern Ireland
 William May (MP for Tavistock), English politician, Member of Parliament for Tavistock, 1413–1421
 Bill May (Washington politician) (1902–1989), American politician, Washington State Representative

Sports
 William May (cricketer) (died 1888), English cricketer
 William W. May (1887–1979), American Olympic sprinter
 Bill May (American football) (active 1913–1915), American football player
 Bill May (American football, born 1913) (1913–2004), American football player
 Bill May (synchronized swimmer) (born 1979), American synchronized swimmer
 Bill May (soccer) (born 1974), retired American soccer goalkeeper
 Billy May (footballer) (1865–1936), English footballer
 Willie May (1936–2012), American hurdler
 Buckshot May (William Herbert May, 1899–1984), American baseball player

Theologians
 William May (theologian) (died 1560), English divine
 William E. May (1928–2014), American moral theologian

Others
 William May (pirate) (fl. 1690–1700), privateer and pirate active in the Indian Ocean
 William May (artistic director) (1953–2009), American-born Australian artistic director, creator of Walking with Dinosaurs - The Live Experience
 William F. May (1915–2011), American co-founder of the Film Society of Lincoln Center
 William F. May (ethicist) (born 1927), American ethicist
 William May (Royal Navy officer) (1849–1930), British admiral active in 1910s
 William Charles May (1853–1931), English sculptor and painter
 Billy May (1916–2004), American composer, arranger and musician
 Willie E. May, American chemist and standards and technology administrator

See also
 William Mays (disambiguation)
 William Mayes (disambiguation)